The Suzuki RV125 is a motorcycle series manufactured by Suzuki from 1972 until 1982 and reintroduced as the RV125 VanVan in 2003.

1972–1982
The original Suzuki RV125 5-speed gearbox an air-cooled,  single-cylinder 2-stroke engine. The RV range also includes  and  machines.

2003 onwards

The all-new RV125 VanVan has a four-stroke, air-cooled, single-cylinder, SOHC engine with  displacement.

It is not designed for heavy mud trails.

From 2007 the VanVan comes with fuel injection instead of the carburettor featured on earlier models. It is often referred to as a 'sandbike', as its low-pressure wide-section tyres helps grip and propel the bike across loose surfaces.

Dimensions and weights

 Overall length: 
 Overall width: 
 Overall height: 
 Wheelbase: 
 Seat height: 
 Dry mass: 
 Fuel capacity:

Engine specifications

 Engine capacity: 	125 cc
 Engine: 	Four-stroke, air-cooled, OHC
 Bore: 	57 mm x 48.8 mm
 Compression ratio: 	9.2 : 1
 Lubrication: 	Wet sump
 Ignition: 	Electronic ignition (transistorised)
 Starter: 	Electric
 Transmission: 	6-speed constant mesh
 Drive: 	Chain

Chassis specification

 Front suspension: 	Telescopic, coil spring, oil damped
 Rear suspension: 	Swingarm type, coil spring, oil damped
 Front brakes: 	Disc brake
 Rear brakes: 	Drum brake
 Front tyres: 	130/80-18 M/C 66P tube type
 Rear tyres: 	180/80-14 M/C 78P tube type

References

External links
  at Suzuki UK
 Suzuki RV125 VanVan (2003-on) review

RV125
Dual-sport motorcycles
Motorcycles introduced in 1972
Motorcycles introduced in 2003